Midway Glacier is a tributary glacier that flows south along the west side of Evans Ridge into Pearl Harbor Glacier, in the Victory Mountains of Victoria Land, Antarctica. At the head, it shares a common snow saddle with Jutland Glacier which flows north. The glacier was named by the southern party of the New Zealand Federated Mountain Clubs Antarctic Expedition (NZFMCAE) of 1962–63 after the Battle of Midway, to continue the series of glaciers named after famous naval battles.

References

Glaciers of Victoria Land
Borchgrevink Coast